Daring Lover is a 2014 Dhallywood film directed by Badiul Alam Khokon. starring Shakib Khan and Apu Biswas in lead roles, while Misa Sawdagar, Probor Mitro and Rehana Jolly play other pivotal roles. Upon release, sahos24.com characterized the film's first day box office as a success.

Plot
Raja (Shakib Khan) is a brilliant man who wants to become a Realtor, much to the chagrin of his father (Prabir Mitra), who doesn't support his goal. Eventually Raja wins the heart of a rich girl, Priya (Apu Biswas), sister of a business tycoon and villainous Rashed Rayhan Chowdhury (Misha Sawdagor) He realizes his ambition in real estate. Rashed wants him to drop his sister; Raja in return demands money. He gives him a check from a dubious bank. However, Raja gets his money as he blackmails Priya's brother, threatening to expose some photos. Rashed also plans an IT raid on Raja's companies. However, that plan backfires. Then Rashed tries to get his sister married to another, but Raja marries her. The story ends with Raja returning all the money taken from Rashed, who finally accepts the marriage.

Cast
 Shakib Khan as Raja
 Apu Biswas as Priya
 Misha Sawdagar as Rashed Rayhan Chowdhury, Priya's brother
 Prabir Mitra as Raja's father
 Rehana Jolly as Raja's mother
 Ilias Kobra
 Ratan Khan as Raja's friend
 Puja Cherry as child artist

Soundtrack

References

External links
 

2014 films
2014 romantic comedy films
Bengali-language Bangladeshi films
Bangladeshi romantic comedy films
Bangladeshi remakes of Indian films
Films scored by Ali Akram Shuvo
2010s Bengali-language films